Pyrausta arabica is a moth in the family Crambidae. It was described by Arthur Gardiner Butler in 1884. It is found in Yemen.

References

Moths described in 1884
arabica
Moths of Asia